1989 World Masters Athletics Championships is the eighth in a series of World Masters Athletics Outdoor Championships (called World Veterans Championships at the time) that took place from 27 July to 6 August 1989 in Eugene, Oregon,

known as the "Track Capital of the World" and as TrackTown USA.

Athletes from the Soviet Union participated for the first time in this series.

The main venue was Hayward Field,

which had hosted the United States track and field Olympic trials in 1972, 1976, and 1980. Some stadia events were held at Silke Field in adjacent Springfield.

This championships was considered a bigger sporting event than those Olympic trials.

Four-time Olympic Champion Al Oerter called these Championships "more like the Olympics than the Olympics", since participating athletes consistently outnumber those at the Olympic Games track and field events. The 4951 participants at this year's "world's largest track meet" dwarfed the 1617 athletics competitors at the 1988 Olympics in Seoul.

The 1968 Summer Olympics 1500m gold medalist Kipchoge Keino carried a friendship torch into the stadium to light an Olympic-style flame during opening ceremonies on Friday, 26 July.

The closing ceremonies was considered more moving than that of the 1984 Summer Olympics in Los Angeles.

This edition of masters athletics Championships had a minimum age limit of 35 years for women and 40 years for men.

The governing body of this series is World Association of Veteran Athletes (WAVA). WAVA was formed during meeting at the inaugural edition of this series at Toronto in 1975, then officially founded during the second edition in 1977, then renamed as World Masters Athletics (WMA) at the Brisbane Championships in 2001.

This Championships was organized by WAVA in coordination with a Local Organising Committee (LOC) of Tom Jordan, Barbara Kousky.

In addition to a full range of track and field events,

non-stadia events included 10K Cross Country, 10K Race Walk (women), 20K Race Walk (men), and Marathon.
Another non-stadia event was new for this series: a 10K Road Race, run through the streets of Eugene.

In the stadia events, the Pentathlon was replaced by Decathlon for men and by Heptathlon for women,

and women's steeplechase was introduced for the first time; the distance was 2K though the barrier height was the same as the men's at 91.4 cm for this Championships.

South Africa
South Africa had been expelled by the International Amateur Athletic Federation (IAAF) in 1976 due to the apartheid policy of the South African government at that time.

The participation of South African athletes in WAVA competitions had been at odds with the IAAF, specifically due to the 1977 WAVA constitution which had stated that

As a compromise, South Africans often competed at these Championships under the flag of other nations before 1987.

During General Assembly at the 1987 Championships, WAVA delegates approved a motion to amend the WAVA constitution and exclude countries whose national federation is suspended by the IAAF.

Thus South African athletes were officially banned from these Championships, and would not be welcomed back until the 1993 edition in Miyazaki,

after the abolition of apartheid and the readmittance of South Africa into IAAF in 1992.

Results
Past Championships results are archived at WMA.

Additional archives are available from Museum of Masters Track & Field

as a pdf book,

as a searchable pdf,

and in pdf newsletters from National Masters News.

Several masters world records were set at this Championships. World records for 1989 are from the list of World Records in the Museum of Masters Track & Field pdf book unless otherwise noted.

Key:

Women

Men

References

World Masters Athletics Championships
World Masters Athletics Championships
International track and field competitions hosted by the United States
1989
Masters athletics (track and field) records